Monosyntaxis is a genus of moths in the family Erebidae. The genus was erected by Swinhoe in 1901.

Species
 Monosyntaxis affinis Rothschild, 1912
 Monosyntaxis bimaculata de Vos, 2009
 Monosyntaxis bipunctata Bethune-Baker, 1904
 Monosyntaxis holmanhunti Hampson, 1914
 Monosyntaxis montanus Schulze, 1910
 Monosyntaxis ochrosphena Wileman & West, 1928
 Monosyntaxis persimilis Rothschild, 1912
 Monosyntaxis radiifera Cerný, 1995
 Monosyntaxis samoensis (Rebel, 1915)
 Monosyntaxis trimaculata (Hampson, 1900)

Former species
 Monosyntaxis metallescens Rothschild, 1912 (now in Papuasyntaxis)

References

de Vos, R. (2009). "The species of the genus Monosyntaxis Swinhoe from New Guinea, with description of a new species and the transfer of another to a new genus (Lepidoptera: Arctiidae, Lithosiinae)". SUGAPA (Suara Serangga Papua) 4 (1): 1–13.

External links

Lithosiina
Moth genera